This is a demography of the population of Saint Pierre and Miquelon including population density, ethnicity, education level, health of the populace, economic status, religious affiliations and other aspects of the population.

Structure of the population 

Structure of the population (2006-01-19, census):

CIA World Factbook demographic statistics 

The following demographic statistics are from the CIA World Factbook, unless otherwise indicated.

Population 

 7,063 (July 2009 est.)

Age structure 

0-14 years: 22.4% (male 806; female 772)
15-64 years: 66.3% (male 2,370; female 2,301)
65 years and over: 11.3% (male 366, female 429; 2008 est.)

Population growth rate 

 0.114% (2008 est.)

Birth rate 

 12.92 births/1,000 population (2008 est.)

Death rate 

 6.81 deaths/1,000 population (2008 est.)

Net migration rate 

 -4.97 migrant(s)/1,000 population (2008 est.)

Sex ratio 

at birth: 1.07 male(s)/female
under 15 years: 1.04 male(s)/female
15-64 years: 1.03 male(s)/female
65 years and over: 0.85 male(s)/female
total population: 1.01 male(s)/female (2008 est.)

Infant mortality rate 

 7.04 deaths/1,000 live births (2008 est.)

Life expectancy at birth 

total population: 78.91 years
male: 76.55 years
female: 81.4 years (2008 est.)

Total fertility rate 

1.98 children born/woman (2008 est.)

Nationality 

noun: Frenchman, Frenchmen, Frenchwoman, Frenchwomen
adjective: French

Ethnic groups 

Basques, Bretons, Normans (French fishermen), French Canadians, including descendants of Acadian refugees, and a number of descendants of Newfoundlanders.

Religions

Languages 

French (official)

Literacy 

definition: age 15 and over can read and write
total population: 99%
male: 99%
female: 99% (1982 est.)

See also
Saint Pierre and Miquelon

References

Geography of Saint Pierre and Miquelon